You Can Get Crazy is the fifth studio album by American country music duo The Bellamy Brothers.  It was released in 1980 via Warner Brothers Records and Curb Records.  The album includes the singles "Sugar Daddy" and "Dancin' Cowboys".

Track listing

Musicians
Adapted from liner notes.

The Bellamy Brothers and the Dizzy Rambler Band
David and Howard Bellamy - lead and harmony vocals, acoustic guitar
Carl Chambers - lead and acoustic guitars
Jesse Chambers - bass guitar
Dannie Jones - steel guitar
Jon LaFrandre - keyboards
Rodney Price - drums

Guest Musicians
Carlos Vega - drums
Alan Eastos - percussion
Bobby Bruce - fiddle

Chart performance

References

1980 albums
The Bellamy Brothers albums
Warner Records albums
Curb Records albums